Memento Park (Hungarian: Szoborpark) is an open-air museum in Budapest, Hungary, dedicated to monumental statues and sculpted plaques from Hungary's Communist period (1949–1989). There are statues of Lenin, Marx, and Engels, as well as several Hungarian Communist leaders. The park was designed by Hungarian architect Ákos Eleőd, who won the competition announced by the Budapest General Assembly (Fővárosi Közgyűlés) in 1991. On public transport diagrams and other documents the park is usually shown as Memorial Park.

A quote by the architect on the project: "This park is about dictatorship. And at the same time, because it can be talked about, described, built, this park is about democracy. After all, only democracy is able to give the opportunity to let us think freely about dictatorship."

Memento Park is divided into two sections: Statue Park, officially named "A Sentence About Tyranny" Park after a poem of the same name by Gyula Illyés, and laid out as six oval sections; and Witness Square (also called "Neverwas Square"), which lies east of the main park entrance and is visible without payment. Statue Park houses 42 of the statues and monuments that were removed from Budapest after the fall of communism. Witness Square holds a replica of Stalin's Boots which became a symbol of the Hungarian Revolution of 1956, after the statue of Stalin was pulled down from its pedestal, and is flanked by two single storey timber structures housing the internal exhibition space, their design being evocative of simple internment camp buildings.

History
After the fall of the Communist regime in Hungary in 1989, many of the Communist statues and monuments were immediately removed. These formed the basis for the current collection of statues in the park. On 29 June 1993, the second anniversary of the withdrawal of the Soviet troops from Hungarian territory, the park celebrated a grand opening as a public outdoor museum.

In 2006, a life-sized copy of the tribune of the Stalin Monument in Budapest was built in the Statue Park with the broken bronze shoes on top of the pedestal. This is not an accurate copy of the original, but an artistic recreation by Ákos Eleőd.

In 2007, a new exhibition hall and a small movie theater were opened in the Witness Square of Memento Park. The photo exhibition called "Stalin's Boots" in the exhibition hall takes the viewer through the history of the 1956 revolution, of the political changes of 1989–1990 and of Memento Park, with both English and Hungarian captions. In the barracks-theater one can see The Life of an Agent, a documentary on the methods used by the secret police, directed by Gábor Zsigmond Papp. The film is shown in Hungarian with English subtitles.

Sculptures, monuments and plaques

The Wall behind the Scenes

The Endless Parade of Liberation Monuments

The Endless Parade of Personalities of the Workers Movement

The Unending Promenade of Worker's Movement Concepts

See also
The Chiang Kai-shek Statues in Taiwan
Fallen Monument Park, the Russian equivalent.
Grūtas Park, in Lithuania, known colloquially as "Stalin World"
List of Sculpture Parks
 Memento Park: A Novel by Mark Sarvas

References

External links

 
 A Sentence on Tyranny – Photographic images of the re-presentation of Soviet-era statues at Szobor Park in Budapest, Hungary An Exhibition in Wellington, New Zealand (2006).

Art museums and galleries in Hungary
Museums in Budapest
Hungarian People's Republic
Sculpture gardens, trails and parks in Europe
Colossal statues
Removed statues
Monument cemeteries